Antoine Latorre (1 August 1915 – 12 June 2001) was a French racing cyclist. He rode in the 1947 Tour de France.

References

External links
 

1915 births
2001 deaths
French male cyclists
Sportspeople from Bordeaux
Cyclists from Nouvelle-Aquitaine